Diana Sarfati (born 1967/1968) is New Zealand's Director–General of Health and a public health physician and health services researcher.  She was formerly head of Te Aho o Te Kahu, the Cancer Control Agency in New Zealand.

Career

Sarfati was appointed Interim Chief Executive of the Cancer Control Agency on 1 December 2019, becoming the permanent chief on 1 July 2020 for what is now known as Te Aho o Te Kahu, Cancer Control Agency.

In that role, she reported to the Minister and Associate Ministers of Health, and advises Government on cancer-related matters. Since being in this role, Te Aho o Te Kahu has produced a number of key reports including a state of nation in cancer report, regular reports on the impact of covid on cancer services, a cancer prevention report, and a report defining the gap in cancer medicine availability between Australia and New Zealand. Sarfati was also involved in the establishment of Peptide Receptor Radionuclide Therapy in New Zealand.

She also sat on Health New Zealand’s Planned Care Taskforce.

Sarfati completed a PhD in 2014 at the University of Otago. Prior to her appointment, Sarfati was Head of the Department of Public Health and the Director of the Cancer and Chronic Conditions (C3) research group at University of Otago, Wellington. Sarfati has focused on researching disparities in cancer outcomes, this work has identified key patient and health system factors that influence cancer survival. It is used extensively by health policy makers, clinicians and other researchers to develop policies and practices that aim to reduce inequities in cancer outcomes in New Zealand and internationally.

Sarfati is also a member of the International Advisory Committee to Lancet Oncology, IARC’s international expert group on social inequalities in cancer, the Board of the International Cancer Benchmarking Project, and she led a Lancet Oncology series on cancer in small island developing states. She is a former member of the National Cancer Programme Leadership Board, the National Screening Advisory Group, the National Ethics Advisory Committee, the Bowel Cancer Taskforce and the National Bowel Cancer Screening Advisory Committee .

In 2019, Sarfati was named NEXT’s Woman of the Year for her focus on promoting equitable cancer treatment.

In July 2022 she became acting Director-General of Health replacing Ashley Bloomfield. In November 2022 she was confirmed as the permanent Director-General for a period of five years.

Selected works 
 Gurney, Jason K., et al. "The impact of the COVID-19 pandemic on cancer diagnosis and service access in New Zealand–a country pursuing COVID-19 elimination." The Lancet Regional Health-Western Pacific 10 (2021): 100127.
 Sarfati, Diana, et al. "Cancer control in the Pacific: big challenges facing small island states." The lancet oncology 20.9 (2019): e475-e492.
  
 Gurney, J. K., et al. "Estimating the risk of acute rheumatic fever in New Zealand by age, ethnicity and deprivation." Epidemiology & Infection 144.14 (2016): 3058–3067.
 Pilleron, Sophie, et al. "Global cancer incidence in older adults, 2012 and 2035: a population‐based study." International journal of cancer 144.1 (2019): 49–58.
 
 S Hill, D Sarfati, B Robson, T Blakely. (2013) Indigenous inequalities in cancer: what role for health care?. ANZ journal of surgery 83 (1-2), 36-41
 AM McDonald, D Sarfati, MG Baker, T Blakely. (2015). Trends in Helicobacter pylori Infection Among Māori, Pacific, and European Birth Cohorts in New Zealand 20 (2), 139–145
 Hill, Sarah, Diana Sarfati, Tony Blakely, Bridget Robson, Gordon Purdie, Jarvis Chen, Elizabeth Dennett et al. "Survival disparities in Indigenous and non-Indigenous New Zealanders with colon cancer: the role of patient comorbidity, treatment and health service factors." Journal of Epidemiology and Community Health 64, no. 2 (2010): 117–123.
 Sarfati, Diana, Sarah Hill, Tony Blakely, Bridget Robson, Gordon Purdie, Elizabeth Dennett, Donna Cormack, and Kevin Dew. "The effect of comorbidity on the use of adjuvant chemotherapy and survival from colon cancer: a retrospective cohort study." BMC Cancer 9, no. 1 (2009): 116.
 Scott, Kate M., Diana Sarfati, Martin I. Tobias, and Stephen J. Haslett. "A challenge to the cross-cultural validity of the SF-36 health survey: Factor structure in Māori, Pacific and New Zealand European ethnic groups." Social Science & Medicine 51, no. 11 (2000): 1655–1664.

References

External links
 
 
 
 institutional homepage

1960s births
Living people
New Zealand women academics
Year of birth missing (living people)
Academic staff of the University of Otago
New Zealand public health doctors
Women public health doctors